may refer to:

 An antiquated name for Japan
 Zipang (film), a 1990 Japanese film
 Zipang (manga), a Japanese manga series, anime, and video game
 A fictional state in the My-Otome anime series; see 
 A Japanese song by Hyde and Yoshiki
 The PC Engine version of the video game Solomon's Key

See also
 "Zipangu" (song), by Pink Lady